The 1963 Dallas mayoral election was held on Tuesday April 2, 1963, with incumbent Earle Cabell being re-elected with 66.6 percent of the vote. During this term of Cabell's mayoralty, President John F. Kennedy would be assassinated in Dallas on November 22, 1963.

Results

References 

1963 Texas elections
Dallas
1963
Non-partisan elections